Khandaker Abdul Malik (1920-2007) was a Bangladeshi politician. He was a three-time elected member of parliament from the prestigious Sylhet-1 and Sylhet-8 seat from the Bangladesh Nationalist Party's in the second national parliament elections of 1979, the fifth parliamentary elections of 1991 and the sixth parliamentary elections of 15 February 1996, Sylhet-1.

Birth and early life 
Khandaker Abdul Malik was born in the village of Ahmedpur of South Surma's Tentli Union in the year 1920.

Political life 
One of the founders of the Bangladesh Nationalist Party is Khandaker Abdul Malik. Sylhet BNP seeds are sown by his hand. He was elected as an MP in Sylhet-1 constituency on 1979, 1991 and 15 February 1996.

Family life 
His youngest son, Khandaker Abdul Muktadir, is BNP chairperson's adviser. He was a candidate from Sylhet-1 for the Jatiya Oikya Front for the BNP in the Jatiya Sangsad election of 2018 election.

Death 
Khandaker Abdul Malik died in 2007.

References 

People from Dakshin Surma Upazila
Bangladesh Nationalist Party politicians
1920 births
2004 deaths
2nd Jatiya Sangsad members
5th Jatiya Sangsad members
6th Jatiya Sangsad members